Lee Marvin (February 19, 1924August 29, 1987) was an American film and television actor. Known for his bass voice and premature white hair, he is best remembered for playing hardboiled "tough guy" characters. Although initially typecast as the "heavy" (i.e. villainous character), he later gained prominence for portraying anti-heroes, such as Detective Lieutenant Frank Ballinger on the television series M Squad (1957–1960). Marvin's notable roles in film included Charlie Strom in The Killers (1964), Rico Fardan in The Professionals (1966), Major John Reisman in The Dirty Dozen (1967), Ben Rumson in Paint Your Wagon (1969), Walker in Point Blank (1967), and the Sergeant in The Big Red One (1980).

Marvin achieved numerous accolades when he portrayed both gunfighter Kid Shelleen and criminal Tim Strawn in a dual role for the comedy Western film Cat Ballou (1965), alongside Jane Fonda, a surprise hit which won him the Academy Award for Best Actor, along with a BAFTA Award, a Golden Globe Award, an NBR Award, and the Silver Bear for Best Actor.

Early life
Lee Marvin was born in New York City to Lamont Waltman Marvin, WWI veteran of the Army Corps of Engineers and an advertising executive, and Courtenay Washington (née Davidge), a fashion writer. As with his elder brother, Robert, he was named in honor of Civil War Confederate General Robert E. Lee, who was his first cousin, four times removed. His father was a direct descendant of Matthew Marvin Sr., who emigrated from Great Bentley, Essex, England in 1635, and helped found Hartford, Connecticut. Marvin studied violin when he was young.  His father was abusive and his mother failed to provide the love kids need. In childhood, Lee Marvin suffered from dyslexia and ADHD. As a teenager, Marvin "spent weekends and spare time hunting deer, puma, wild turkey, and bobwhite in the wilds of the then-uncharted Everglades".

He attended Manumit School, a Christian socialist boarding school in Pawling, New York, during the late 1930s, and Peekskill Military Academy in Peekskill, New York. He later attended St. Leo College Preparatory School, a Catholic school in St. Leo, Florida, after being expelled from several other schools for bad behavior (smoking cigarettes and fights).

Military service

World War II

Marvin enlisted in the United States Marine Corps on August 12, 1942. Before finishing School of Infantry, he was a quartermaster. Lee served in the 4th Marine Division as a scout sniper in the Pacific Theater during World War II, including assaults on Eniwetok and Saipan-Tinian. While serving as a member of "I" Company, 3rd Battalion, 24th Marines, 4th Marine Division, Lee participated in 21 Japanese islands  landings and was wounded in action on June 18, 1944, during the assault on Mount Tapochau in the Battle of Saipan, during which most of his company were casualties. He was hit by machine gun fire, which severed his sciatic nerve, and then was hit again in the foot by a sniper. After over a year of medical treatment in naval hospitals, Marvin was given a medical discharge with the rank of private first class. He previously held the rank of corporal, but had been demoted for troublemaking.

Marvin's decorations include the Purple Heart Medal, the Presidential Unit Citation, the American Campaign Medal, the Asiatic-Pacific Campaign Medal, the World War II Victory Medal, and the Combat Action Ribbon.

Medals and ribbons

Acting career

Early acting career
After the war, while working as a plumber's assistant at a local community theatre in upstate New York, Marvin was asked to replace an actor who had fallen ill during rehearsals. He caught the acting bug and got a job with the company at $7 a week. He moved to Greenwich Village and used the G.I. Bill to study at the American Theatre Wing.

He appeared on stage in a production of Uniform of Flesh, the original version  of Billy Budd (1949). It was performed at the Experimental Theatre, where a few months later, Marvin also appeared in The Nineteenth Hole of Europe (1949).

Marvin began appearing on television shows like Escape, The Big Story, and Treasury Men in Action.

He made it to Broadway with a small role in a production of Uniform of Flesh, now titled Billy Budd, in February 1951.

Hollywood
Marvin's film debut was in You're in the Navy Now (1951), directed by Henry Hathaway, a movie that also marked the debuts of Charles Bronson and Jack Warden. This required some filming in Hollywood. Marvin decided to stay in California.

He had a similar small part in Teresa (1951), directed by Fred Zinnemann. As a decorated combat veteran, Marvin was a natural in war dramas, where he frequently assisted the director and other actors in realistically portraying infantry movement, arranging costumes, and the use of firearms.

He guest starred on episodes of Fireside Theatre, Suspense and Rebound. Hathaway used him again on Diplomatic Courier (1952) and he could be seen in Down Among the Sheltering Palms (1952), directed by Edmund Goulding, We're Not Married! (1952), also for Goulding, The Duel at Silver Creek (1952) directed by Don Siegel, and Hangman's Knot (1952), directed by Roy Huggins.

He guest starred on Biff Baker, U.S.A. and Dragnet, and had a showcase role as the squad leader in a feature titled Eight Iron Men (1952), a war film directed by Edward Dmytryk and produced by Stanley Kramer (Marvin's role had been played on Broadway by Burt Lancaster).

He was a sergeant in Seminole (1953), a Western directed by Budd Boetticher, and was a corporal in The Glory Brigade (1953), a Korean War film.

Marvin guest starred in The Doctor, The Revlon Mirror Theater , Suspense again and The Motorola Television Hour.

He was now in much demand for Westerns: The Stranger Wore a Gun (1953) with Randolph Scott, and Gun Fury (1953) with Rock Hudson.

The Big Heat and The Wild One
Marvin received much acclaim for his portrayal as villains in two films: The Big Heat (1953) where he played Gloria Grahame's vicious boyfriend, directed by Fritz Lang; and The Wild One (1953) opposite Marlon Brando (Marvin's gang in the film was named "The Beetles"), produced by Kramer.

He continued in TV shows such as The Plymouth Playhouse and The Pepsi-Cola Playhouse. He had support roles in Gorilla at Large (1954) and had a notable small role as smart-aleck sailor Meatball in The Caine Mutiny (1954), produced by Kramer.

Marvin was in The Raid (1954), Center Stage, Medic and TV Reader's Digest.

He had a part as Hector, the small-town hood in Bad Day at Black Rock (1955) with Spencer Tracy. Also in 1955, he played a conflicted, brutal bank-robber in Violent Saturday. A critic wrote of the character, "Marvin brings a multi-faceted complexity to the role and gives a great example of the early promise that launched his long and successful career."

Marvin played Robert Mitchum's and Frank Sinatra's friend in Not as a Stranger (1955), a medical drama produced and directed by Stanley Kramer. He had good supporting roles in A Life in the Balance (1955) (he was third billed), and Pete Kelly's Blues (1955) and appeared on TV in Jane Wyman Presents The Fireside Theatre and Studio One in Hollywood.

Marvin was in I Died a Thousand Times (1955) with Jack Palance, Shack Out on 101 (1955), Kraft Theatre, and Front Row Center.

Marvin was the villain in Seven Men from Now (1956) with Randolph Scott directed by Boetticher. He was second-billed to Palance in Attack (1956) directed by Robert Aldrich.

Marvin had roles in Pillars of the Sky (1956) with Jeff Chandler, The Rack (1956) with Paul Newman, Raintree County (1957) with Elizabeth Taylor and Montgomery Clift and a leading role in The Missouri Traveler (1958). He also guest starred on Climax! (several times), Studio 57, The United States Steel Hour and Schlitz Playhouse.

M Squad

Marvin debuted as a leading man in M Squad as Chicago cop Frank Ballinger in 100 episodes of the successful 1957–1960 television series. One critic described the show as "a hyped-up, violent Dragnet ... with a hard-as-nails Marvin" playing a tough police lieutenant. Marvin received the role after guest-starring in a Dragnet episode as a serial killer.

When the series ended Marvin appeared on Westinghouse Desilu Playhouse, Sunday Showcase, The Barbara Stanwyck Show, The Americans, Wagon Train, Checkmate, General Electric Theater, Alcoa Premiere, The Investigators, Route 66 (he was injured during a fight scene), Ben Casey, Bonanza, The Untouchables (several times), The Virginian, The Twilight Zone ("The Grave" and "Steel"), The Dick Powell Theatre, and The Investigators.

Early 1960s

The Man Who Shot Liberty Valance
Marvin returned to feature films with a prominent role in The Comancheros (1961) starring John Wayne and Stuart Whitman. He played in two more films with Wayne, both directed by John Ford: The Man Who Shot Liberty Valance (1962), and Donovan's Reef (1963). As the vicious Liberty Valance, Marvin played his first title role and held his own with two of the screen's biggest stars (Wayne and James Stewart).

Television
In 1962 Marvin appeared as Martin Kalig on the TV western The Virginian in the episode titled "It Tolls for Thee." He continued to guest star on shows like Combat!, Dr. Kildare and The Great Adventure. He did The Case Against Paul Ryker for Kraft Suspense Theatre.

The Killers
For director Don Siegel, Marvin appeared in The Killers (1964) playing an efficient professional assassin alongside Clu Gulager, grappling with villain Ronald Reagan and Angie Dickinson. The Killers was the first film in which Marvin received top billing. Originally made as a TV-movie, the film was deemed so entertaining that it was exhibited in theatres instead.

He guest starred on Bob Hope Presents the Chrysler Theatre.

Cat Ballou and stardom
Marvin finally became a star for his comic role in the offbeat Western Cat Ballou (1965) starring Jane Fonda. This was a surprise hit and Marvin won the Academy Award for Best Actor. He also won the Silver Bear for Best Actor at the 15th Berlin International Film Festival in 1965.

Playing alongside Vivien Leigh and Simone Signoret, Marvin won the 1966 National Board of Review Award for male actors for his role in Ship of Fools (1965) directed by Kramer.

The Professionals
Marvin next performed in the highly regarded Western The Professionals (1966), in which he played the leader of a small band of skilled mercenaries (Burt Lancaster, Robert Ryan, and Woody Strode) rescuing a kidnap victim (Claudia Cardinale) shortly after the Mexican Revolution. He had second billing to Lancaster but his part was almost as large.

The Dirty Dozen
He followed that film with the hugely successful World War II epic The Dirty Dozen (1967) in which top-billed Marvin again portrayed an intrepid commander of a colorful group (played by John Cassavetes, Charles Bronson, Telly Savalas, Jim Brown, and Donald Sutherland) performing an almost impossible mission. Robert Aldrich directed. In an interview, Marvin stated his time in the Marine Corps helped shape that role "for playing an officer how I felt it should have been seen, from the bias of an enlisted man's viewpoint".

Point Blank
In the wake of these films and after having received his Oscar, Marvin was a huge star, given enormous control over his next film Point Blank. In Point Blank, an influential film from director John Boorman, he portrayed a hard-nosed criminal bent on revenge. Marvin, who had selected Boorman for the director's slot, had a central role in the film's development, plot, and staging.

Hell in the Pacific and Sergeant Ryker
In 1968, Marvin also appeared in another Boorman film, the critically acclaimed but commercially unsuccessful World War II character study Hell in the Pacific, also starring famed Japanese actor Toshiro Mifune. Boorman recounted his work with Lee Marvin on these two films and Marvin's influence on his career in the 1998 documentary Lee Marvin: A Personal Portrait by John Boorman. The Case Against Paul Ryker with Bradford Dillman, which Marvin shot for TV's Kraft Suspense Theatre and had been telecast in 1963, was released theatrically as Sergeant Ryker in 1968 after the runaway success of The Dirty Dozen.

Paint Your Wagon
Marvin was originally cast as Pike Bishop (later played by William Holden) in The Wild Bunch (1969), but fell out with director Sam Peckinpah and pulled out to star in the Western musical Paint Your Wagon (1969), in which he was top-billed over a singing Clint Eastwood. Despite his limited singing ability, he had a hit with the song "Wand'rin' Star". By this time, he was getting paid $1 million per film, $200,000 less than top star Paul Newman was making at the time, yet he was ambivalent about the movie business, even with its financial rewards:

You spend the first forty years of your life trying to get in this business, and the next forty years trying to get out. And then when you're making the bread, who needs it?

1970s
Marvin had a much greater variety of roles in the 1970s, with fewer 'bad-guy' roles than in earlier years. His 1970s movies included Monte Walsh (1970), a Western with Palance and Jeanne Moreau; the violent Prime Cut (1972) with Gene Hackman; Pocket Money (1972) with Paul Newman, for Stuart Rosenberg; Emperor of the North (1973) opposite Ernest Borgnine for Aldrich; as Hickey in The Iceman Cometh (1973) with Fredric March and Robert Ryan, for John Frankenheimer; The Spikes Gang (1974) with Noah Beery Jr. for Richard Fleischer; The Klansman (1974) with Richard Burton; Shout at the Devil (1976), a World War I adventure with Roger Moore, directed by Peter Hunt; The Great Scout & Cathouse Thursday (1976), a comic Western with Oliver Reed; and Avalanche Express (1979), a Cold War thriller with Robert Shaw who died during production, as did the film's director, both from heart attacks. None of these films were big box-office hits.

Marvin was offered the role of Quint in Jaws (1975) but declined, stating "What would I tell my fishing friends who'd see me come off a hero against a dummy shark?"

1980s
Marvin's last big role was in Samuel Fuller's The Big Red One (1980), a war film based on Fuller's own war experiences.

His remaining films were Death Hunt (1981), a Canadian action movie with Charles Bronson, directed by Hunt; Gorky Park (1983) with William Hurt; and Dog Day (1984), shot in France.

For TV he did The Dirty Dozen: Next Mission (1985; a sequel with Marvin, Ernest Borgnine, and Richard Jaeckel picking up where they had left off despite being 18 years older).

His final appearance was in The Delta Force (1986) with Chuck Norris, playing a role turned down by Charles Bronson.

Personal life
Marvin was a Democrat. He publicly endorsed John F. Kennedy in the 1960 presidential election. Due to injuries that he sustained in the war, that led to PTSD, Lee became anti-war minded and opposed the Vietnam War. In a 1969 Playboy interview, Marvin said he supported gay rights.

Marriages, children and partners
Marvin married Betty Ebeling in April 1952 and together they had four children, son Christopher Lamont, and three daughters: Courtenay Lee, Cynthia Louise, and Claudia Leslie. After a separation of two years, they divorced in January 1967. In her 2010 book, Tales of a Hollywood Housewife: A Memoir by the First Mrs. Lee Marvin, Betty claimed that Lee had an affair with actress Anne Bancroft.

He married Pamela Feeley in 1970 following his famous relationship with Michelle Triola. Pamela had four children from three previous marriages; they had no children together and remained married until his death in 1987.

Community property case
See also Marvin v. Marvin
In 1971, Marvin was sued by Michelle Triola, his live-in girlfriend from 1965 to 1970, who legally changed her surname to "Marvin". Although the couple never married, she sought financial compensation similar to that available to spouses under California's alimony and community property laws. Triola claimed Marvin made her pregnant three times and paid for two abortions, while one pregnancy ended in miscarriage. She claimed the second abortion left her unable to bear children. The result was the landmark "palimony" case, Marvin v. Marvin, 18 Cal. 3d 660 (1976).

In 1979, Marvin was ordered to pay $104,000 to Triola for "rehabilitation purposes", but the court denied her community property claim for one-half of the $3.6 million which Marvin had earned during their six years of cohabitation – distinguishing nonmarital relationship contracts from marriage, with community property rights only attaching to the latter by operation of law. Rights equivalent to community property only apply in nonmarital relationship contracts when the parties expressly, whether orally or in writing, contract for such rights to operate between them. In August 1981, the California Court of Appeal found that no such contract existed between them and nullified the award she had received. Michelle Triola died of lung cancer on October 30, 2009, having been with actor Dick Van Dyke since 1976.

Later there was controversy after Marvin characterized the trial as a "circus", saying "everyone was lying, even I lied". There were official comments about possibly charging Marvin with perjury, but no charges were filed.

This case was used as fodder for a mock debate skit on Saturday Night Live called "Point Counterpoint" and a skit on The Tonight Show Starring Johnny Carson with Carson as Adam, and Betty White as Eve.

Death

A heavy smoker and drinker, Marvin had health problems by the end of his life. In December 1986, Marvin was hospitalized for more than two weeks because of a condition related to coccidioidomycosis. He went into respiratory distress and was administered steroids to help his breathing. He had major intestinal ruptures as a result, and underwent a colectomy. Marvin died of a heart attack on August 29, 1987, aged 63. He was buried with full military honors at Arlington National Cemetery.

Filmography

Film

Television

See also

The Sons of Lee Marvin, a tongue-in-cheek secret society dedicated to Marvin
Welcome to Night Vale, which features Lee Marvin as an integral piece of its mythology and supporting cast.

References

Notes

Citations

Bibliography

 Bailey, Mark. Of All the Gin Joints: Stumbling through Hollywood History. Chapel Hill, North Carolina: Algonquin Books, 2014. .
 Bean, Kendra. Vivien Leigh: An Intimate Portrait. Philadelphia, Pennsylvania: Running Press, 2013. .
 David, Catherine. Simone Signoret. New York: Overlook Press, 1995. .
 Epstein, Dwayne. Lee Marvin: Point Blank. Tucson, Arizona: Schaffner Press, Inc., 2013. .
 Lentz, Robert J. Lee Marvin: His Films and Career. Jefferson, North Carolina: McFarland & Company, 2000. .
 Marvin, Betty. Tales of a Hollywood Housewife: A Memoir by the First Mrs. Lee Marvin. Bloomington, Indiana: iUniverse, 2010. .
 Marvin, Pamela. Lee: A Romance. London: Faber & Faber Limited, 1997. .
 Walker, Alexander. Vivien: The Life of Vivien Leigh. New York: Grove Press, 1987. .
 Wise, James E. and Anne Collier Rehill. Stars in the Corps: Movie Actors in the United States Marines. Annapolis, Maryland: Naval Institute Press, 1999. .
 Zec, Donald. Marvin: The Story of Lee Marvin. New York: St. Martin's Press, 1980. .

External links

 
 
 Profile of Marvin in Film Comment

1924 births
1987 deaths
20th-century American male actors
American male film actors
American male television actors
American people of English descent
American shooting survivors
Best Actor Academy Award winners
Best Foreign Actor BAFTA Award winners
Best Musical or Comedy Actor Golden Globe (film) winners
Burials at Arlington National Cemetery
Male Western (genre) film actors
Male actors from New York City
New York (state) Democrats
People from Woodstock, New York
Saint Leo College Preparatory School alumni
Saint Leo University alumni
Silver Bear for Best Actor winners
United States Marine Corps personnel of World War II
United States Marines